The Chapelle Sainte Catherine is a Roman Catholic chapel located in Hombourg-Haut, in the historic region of Lorraine, France.

Built by the knight Simon of Hombourg between 1250 and 1270, it initially was a private chapel, surrounded by the buildings of the knights' castle. Its towers and walls made up the outer part of a big medieval castle.

The chapel was renovated in 1706, 1897 and 1984. It was registered as a listed building in 1895 under German authority and again in 1930 as Monument historique.

Further reading
Vion, Vincent, La chapelle Sainte Catherine et les saints auxiliaires, coll. Monographies hombourgeoises.

References

External links
 Interior of the chapel

Buildings and structures completed in 1270
Roman Catholic chapels in France